Marsel Nakipovich Tukhvatullin (born 22 November 1974 in Kazan) is a former Russian football player.

References

1974 births
Footballers from Kazan
Living people
Russian footballers
FC KAMAZ Naberezhnye Chelny players
Russian Premier League players
FC Rubin Kazan players
Association football forwards